Electronic bill payment is a feature of online, mobile and telephone banking, similar in its effect to a giro, allowing a customer of a financial institution to transfer money from their transaction or credit card account to a creditor or vendor such as a public utility, department store or an individual to be credited against a specific account. These payments are typically executed electronically as a direct deposit through a national payment system, operated by the banks or in conjunction with the government.  Payment is typically initiated by the payer but can also be set up as a direct debit.

In addition to the bill payment facility, most banks will also offer various features with their electronic bill payment systems. These include the ability to schedule payments in advance to be made on a specified date (convenient for installments such as mortgage and support payments), to save the biller information for reuse at a future time and various options for searching the recent payment history. In many cases the payment data can also be downloaded and posted directly into the customer's accounting or personal finance software.

History

Although this technology was available from the mid 1990s, uptake was initially slow until internet access by households increased. By 2000, adoption of electronic bill payment systems started to dramatically increase.

Impact
From the consumer's point of view, electronic payment of bills is cheaper, faster, and more convenient than writing, posting and reconciling cheques. In addition, though limitations exist, a wider range of bank accounts or credit cards can be used for the electronic payment of bills. Paying bills online allows you to use a variety of payment methods rather than the traditional cheque.

Using electronic bill presentment and payment enables businesses to fast-track customer payments and get access to funds faster, which in turn results in cash flow improvement.

For banks the advantages of electronic bill payments are a reduction in processing costs minimizing paperwork and an increase in customer loyalty. In a 2003 study, the banks said that "customers who pay online show more loyalty and are more receptive to other offers".

See also
 Direct credit
 E-commerce payment system
 Electronic billing
 Digital Wallet
 Mobile banking
 Unified Payments Interface

References

Payment systems
Banking technology